Seven vessels of the British Royal Navy have been named HMS Valiant.

 , a schooner launched at Oswego, New York, Thirteen Colonies and captured by the French in 1756.
 , launched in 1759 at Chatham, was a third-rate ship of the line of 74 guns.
 , launched in 1807, was a  third-rate.
 HMS Valiant was ordered in June 1825 as another third-rate, but was cancelled in February 1831.
 , launched in 1863, was a  ironclad battleship, scrapped in 1957.
 , launched in 1914, was a  that served in World War I and World War II.
 , launched in 1963, was a nuclear-powered submarine, the lead boat of her class. She was paid off in 1994.
 HMS Valiant will be the second boat of the  class.

Battle honours

Belle Isle, 1761
Havana, 1762
Ushant, 1781
The Saints, 1782
First of June, 1794
Basque Roads, 1809
Jutland, 1916
Norway, 1940
Mediterranean, 1940−43
Matapan, 1941
Crete, 1941
Malta Convoys, 1941
Sicily, 1943
Salerno, 1943
Sabang, 1944
Falklands, 1982

Other
 , customs cutter

In Popular Culture
Airborne Aircraft Carrier HMS Valiant From Dr. Who

References

See also
 
 Valiant (disambiguation)

Royal Navy ship names